Love You More is a short drama directed by Sam Taylor-Wood, written by Patrick Marber and produced by Anthony Minghella, which was screened in Main Competition for the Palme d'Or at the 2008 Cannes Film Festival. The film includes two songs by Buzzcocks and features a cameo appearance by the band's lead singer Pete Shelley as a customer at a record store.

External links

References

2008 films
2008 drama films
Films directed by Sam Taylor-Wood
British drama short films
2000s English-language films
2000s British films
2008 short films
English-language drama films